Phytotaxa is a peer-reviewed scientific journal for rapid publication on any aspect of systematic botany. It publishes on a wide range of subjects, but focuses on new species, monographs, floras, revisions, reviews, and typification issues. Phytotaxa covers all plant groups covered by the International Code of Nomenclature for algae, fungi, and plants, including diatoms, fungi, algae, lichens, mosses, hornworts, liverworts, and vascular plants), both living and fossil.

The journal was established in 2009 by Maarten Christenhusz and the first issue appeared in October 2009. Authors have the option to publish open access.

Abstracting and indexing 
The journal is abstracted and indexed in Science Citation Index Expanded, Current Contents/Agriculture, Biology & Environmental Sciences, and BIOSIS Previews.

See also
 Zootaxa

References

External links 

 

Botany journals
Publications established in 2009
English-language journals
Hybrid open access journals
Magnolia Press academic journals